The Huntsville massacre refers to the execution during the Civil War of nine local men, including three Confederate soldiers, by Union soldiers on January 10, 1863, in Huntsville, Arkansas. No formal charges were filed, and the US Army discharged the commanding officer. The prisoners may have been suspected of being Confederate sympathizers. A few months before, guerrillas had attacked a force of 25 Union troops in the area.

The event was discussed secretly and nearly lost until a historian wrote about it in a history quarterly in 1974. More research has been published on this topic, and a memorial to the victims was erected in 2006.

Background
In 1862, after the Battle of Pea Ridge in Arkansas, Isaac Murphy of Huntsville had received death threats and was forced to flee his home. He had represented Madison County in the state House but was known to have voted against secession at the start of the war. He was with the Army in Missouri. By the fall of 1862, his daughters wished to visit him in Pea Ridge, Arkansas, where Murphey had taken a civilian position on General Curtis's staff. The Union Army escorted them to return to their home of Huntsville, then under Union control.

Two miles from town, the escort of 25 soldiers sent the daughters along to the town alone and set up camp to rest. The soldiers were attacked by a local Confederate guerrilla band. Eighteen men were killed, and seven of the Union soldiers survived the skirmish.

After the Battle of Prairie Grove, Union General Francis Herron was ordered to take his 5,000 troops northeast to the Mississippi River, where he would connect with the army under the command of General Ulysses S. Grant in the push for Vicksburg. While Herron's troops passed through Huntsville, they were told that Murphy's daughters were being harassed by locals and had lost some personal property at their hands. Within days Union soldiers had arrested several local men, but no official charges were filed.

Executions
In the early morning hours of January 10, 1863, nine of the arrested men were taken from where they were being detained by members of Company G, 8th Regiment Missouri Volunteer Cavalry, under the command of Lieutenant Colonel Elias Briggs Baldwin. The men were Chesley H. Boatright, William Martin Berry, Hugh Samuel Berry, John William Moody, Askin Hughes, John Hughes, Watson P. Stevens, Robert Coleman Young, and Bill Parks. Hugh Samuel Berry and Askin Hughes were captains in the Confederate Army and home on leave. John William Moody was a Confederate officer with the Fourth Regiment, Arkansas Cavalry, and a former US Marshal. William Martin Berry was a son-in-law to Isaac Murphy. All were shot, and eight died. Bill Parks was left for dead but survived the shooting and later moved to Mississippi.

No official charges had been filed against the men. The reason for the executions was not documented: whether they were retaliation for the 18 Union soldiers killed in the fall of 1862 by guerrillas or whether the incident was from another unknown cause. 

After the executions, Bill Parks, who had been left for dead, crawled to a nearby farmhouse, where his wounds were treated. When asked what had happened and who did it, he responded, "Men of the 8th Missouri Regiment. But Johnson, Ham and Murphy had it done." He referred to the attorneys Isaac Murphy, E.D. Ham, and Union Colonel James Johnson. Although Baldwin had been present and ordered his forces to shoot the prisoners, Parks did not mention him.

Word of the executions spread quickly. Baldwin was arrested and charged by the Union Army with "violation of the 6th Article of War for the murder of prisoners of war." He was transported to Springfield, Missouri and held for a court martial. As many witnesses were on active military duty and unable to attend the trial, and several civilian witnesses were displaced or unable to travel to Springfield, the US Army dropped the charges and discharged Baldwin.

Aftermath
Two local colleges closed that had been affiliated with the Masons. The local Masonic chapter believed that Isaac Murphy had something to do with the executions, and several of those executed were members of the Masons. Murphy's daughters and wife had operated the female seminary, and Murphy headed the other college. The Masons chapter ended the financial support of both schools, forcing them to close. 

Murphy became active with the Republican Party and had a distinguished political career by being elected governor in 1863 and staying in office during the first years of Reconstruction in Arkansas. Colonel James Johnson was later elected from Arkansas as a US Representative, and later Lieutenant Governor and Secretary of State of the state. The state legislature elected E.D. Ham as a Senator for Arkansas, also winning election as a District Attorney and Circuit Judge. Short of Baldwin's arrest and dismissal from the army on less-than-honorable circumstances, no one was punished for the deaths of the Confederates.

For decades afterward, locals in the area commemorated the event by annually decorating the site with flowers, but few spoke publicly about it. In 1974, the historian John I. Smith published several articles about the murders in the Northwest Arkansas Times since he had uncovered accounts of the massacre while researching a biography on Isaac Murphy. On September 30, 2006, a monument commemorating the event was dedicated at the execution site.

References
Joy Russell and Kevin Hatfield, "The Huntsville Massacre—The Civil War Forever Changes a Community." Madison County Musings 25 (Winter 2006): 174–192.
Joy Russell and Dr. Kevin Hatfield, "The Huntsville Massacre-—The Civil War Forever Changes a Community." (2006), Huntsville Lodge No. 364. http://www.huntsville364.org/Huntsville%20Massacre.html pdf 
The Huntsville Massacre. Huntsville, AR : Madison County Genealogical and Historical Society, 2007.
Smith, John "The Huntsville Massacre." Carroll County Historical Quarterly 19 (Summer–Fall 1974): 10–12.

External links
 "Huntsville Massacre", Encyclopedia of Arkansas Culture and History
 from Abby Burnett, "Honoring Fallen Civilians/ Massacre Monument Dedicated", The Morning News, 16 October 2006; posted as "Huntsville Massacre Monument Dedication", Arkansas GenWeb 
 Huntsville Massacre Memorial, History- Sites
 Huntsville Massacre PowerPoint Presentation

Arkansas in the American Civil War
Massacres in the United States
Murder in Arkansas
1863 in Arkansas
Mass murder in the United States
Crimes in Arkansas
January 1863 events
Massacres committed by the United States
People executed by the United States military by firing squad
Union war crimes